William Perry Herring McFaddin (1856–1935), known as Perry, was a rancher and early landowner in the early years of Beaumont, Texas.  Under William McFaddin, the McFaddin Ranches of Beaumont reached their greatest extent. The Spindletop oil gusher was located on land leased from McFaddin.  The site of Port Arthur, Texas, was purchased from McFaddin by Arthur Edward Stilwell.  Former pieces of the McFaddin Ranches now make up Sea Rim State Park, the McFaddin National Wildlife Refuge, and the J.D. Murphree Wildlife Management Area.  The McFaddin-Ward House was erected on his homestead and is listed in the National Register of Historic Places.

Quotes
"Sister, don't give up the land.
They are not making land anymore."
W.P.H. McFaddin, quoted by Mamie McFaddin Ward
in The Beaumont Enterprise (February 1961)

References

External links

People from Beaumont, Texas
1856 births
1935 deaths
Ranchers from Texas